Zygiella atrica is a species of spider.

Like other Zygiella species, it builds an orb web with two missing sectors, and a signalling thread in the center of those, leading to its hideout, whereas young spiders build a complete web.

Unlike Z. x-notata, this spider is found away from houses, on bushes and rocky sites away from human habitation. It is also more brown. Its eggs are lethal to mice.

References

Araneidae
Spiders of Europe
Spiders of Russia
Spiders described in 1845